Yes Boss is an Indian sitcom which aired on SAB TV from 23 April 1999 to 31 July 2009.

Plot 
Meera and Mohan Srivastava are married, have a child named Bittu (only shown in the first few episodes) and working in the  Adcraft Ad Agency. Husband Mohan is the Junior creative visualizer and his wife is creative director of Adcraft Ad Agency.

Their MD Vinod Verma arrives and they have not disclosed their relationship to their boss who does not miss any chance of flirting with Meera. Mohan hates it and spends most of his time protecting his wife from Mr. Verma. Vinod thinks that Meera is married to an elderly man named Bunty-Ji, who is Mohan himself disguised as an old man, partly to irritate Vinod. Vinod is irritated with wife Kavita and he doesn't like the friendship of his wife Kavita and his employee Mohan.

Cast and characters

Main
 Aasif Sheikh as Vinod Verma; Kavita's husband,  Adcraft Ad Agency's Md, Meera and Mohan's boss
 Rakesh Bedi as Mohan Srivastava; Meera's husband, Vinod's employee in the Adcraft ad agency who holds the post of junior creative visualizer, Bittu's father, Kavita's friend Bunty Srivastava; Meera's husband in front of their boss Vinod
 Kavita Kapoor (1999–2007; 2007–2009) as Meera Srivastava; Mohan's wife and his boss in the office, Creative Director of the Adcraft ad agency and Vinod's employee, Bittu's mother
Sonia Kapoor as Meera Srivastava (2007); replaced Kavita for few episodes.

Recurring
 Delnaaz Paul (1999–2004; 2007–2009) as Kavita Vinod Verma; Vinod's wife
Ritu Kambow (2004-2005) as Kavita Vinod Verma, eplaced Irani in 2004.
Bhairavi Raichura (2005–2007) as Kavita Vinod Verma; replaced Kambow in 2005.
 Sulbha Arya as Savitri / Rampyaari, Sasu Maa, Mohan's mother-in-law, Meera's mother, Bittu's grandmother, Vinod and Kavita's Aunt 
 Parul Yadav as Lucky 
 Nigaar Khan as Angelina Madam, Boss of Hot News
 Priya Wal as Princess Imarti
 Hema Diwan as Mawsiji
 Sharad Vyas as Lacchu Patel; VP of the Adcraft ad agency
 Sheetal Agashe as Sheetal, Verma Ji's PA, employee at the Adcraft ad agency
 Bharat Kamwani as Bharat; Mohan's PA, employee in Adcraft ad agency
 Ashiesh Roy as Tanveer, copywriter in the  Adcraft ad agency office
 Jaywant Wadkar as Saddu, the Peon in the office
Neeta S Chawla as Nita; Bharat's PA
 Savita Malpekar as Vinod Verma's mother, Kavita's mother in law and Meera and Mohan's aunt .
 Nilesh Divekar as Chai wala Vijay/various roles/ Khunkhar
 Romanchak Arora as Goldie Lacchu Patel
Kenneth Desai as Shekar Kapoor ; President of Ad Craft Ad Agency 
 Firdous Mevawala as Chairman 
Anup Upadhyay as Various Characters
 Shekhar Shukla as various Characters
Manoj Santoshi as Various Characters
Rakesh Kukreti as Various Characters
 Rupali Ganguly as Sharmili, Vinod's ex-girlfriend
 Vinay Yedekar as Anil Kumar Original
 Amit Bhatt as various characters
 Sham Mashalkar as various characters
 Rakhee Vijan as Katrina(Buntyji’s daughter)

References

1999 Indian television series debuts
2009 Indian television series endings
Sony SAB original programming
Indian comedy television series
Workplace comedy television series